Francis Davis (born August 30, 1946) is an American author and journalist.  He is best known as the jazz critic for The Village Voice, and a contributing editor for The Atlantic Monthly.  He has also worked in radio and film, and taught courses on Jazz and Blues at the University of Pennsylvania.  He was a 1994 recipient of the  Pew Fellowships in the Arts.

Life and career
Davis was born in Philadelphia. He attended Temple University (1964–69); he emerged in the early 1980s as the jazz critic for The Philadelphia Inquirer.  Along with his jazz writing he has tackled a wide variety of subjects, such as Seinfeld  and Johnny Cash, for whom he published what many fans consider the definitive appreciation, in The Atlantic Monthly.
Davis is characterized by his keen insights into the development of American style and culture, with asides in the first person who balance his theoretical certainty and a witty, human element. His articles and essays on figures such as Frank Sinatra and Anthony Davis impart a sharp picture of a writer coming of age, and aging, with the artists of his generation.   

Over the past few decades he has sat with Betty Carter, Sonny Rollins, Wynton Marsalis, Sun Ra, and the late New Yorker film critic, Pauline Kael, after whose lengthy discussions Davis penned, Afterglow: A Last Conversation with Pauline Kael.

Along with international publication Davis has been widely recognized with awards, including a Guggenheim Fellowship in 1992, and a Pew Fellowship the following year.  He is a multiple recipient of the ASCAP-Deems Taylor Award, and was nominated for a Grammy Award in 1989 (with Martin Williams and Dick Katz) for his liner notes to Jazz Piano for the Smithsonian Collection of Recordings.  Davis won the 2008 Grammy Award for Best Album Notes, for the Miles Davis album, Kind of Blue: 50th Anniversary Collector's Edition.

Stanley Crouch, a famed jazz critic who frequently writes about race relations, took Davis to task in a 2003 Jazz Times column for allegedly speaking with condescension toward the predominantly black contingent of musicians who create "jazz that is based on swing and blues." Because of what Crouch alleges to be underlying racial resentment and fear, Davis "lifts up someone like, say, Dave Douglas as an antidote to too much authority from the dark side of the tracks," according to Crouch. Crouch was fired from Jazz Times after writing the column.

Davis lives in Philadelphia and is married to Terry Gross, producer and host of the NPR program Fresh Air.

Bibliography

 In the Moment (Oxford University Press, 1986)
 Outcats (Oxford University Press, 1990)
 The History of the Blues (Hyperion, 1995)
 Bebop and Nothingness (Schirmer, 1996)
 Like Young (Da Capo, 2001)
 Afterglow: A Last Conversation with Pauline Kael (Da Capo, 2002)
 Jazz and Its Discontents: A Francis Davis Reader (Da Capo, 2004)

References

External links
Da Capo Press: Author Profile
Pew Fellowships in the Arts

1946 births
Living people
The Atlantic (magazine) people
Jazz writers
Pew Fellows in the Arts
The Philadelphia Inquirer people
Temple University alumni
Writers from Philadelphia